Juslibol is a rural district of the city of Zaragoza, Spain. As of 2013, it has a population of 1518 inhabitants.

Main sights 
 Castle of Juslibol
 Castle of Miranda
 Galacho de Juslibol

External links 

Populated places in the Province of Zaragoza